The Chapel of Graces of the Miraculous Virgin (French: La Chapelle du Grâce de Sainte Vierge Miraculeuse) or informally the Chapel of Our Lady of the Miraculous Medal, is a Marian pontifical shrine located in Paris, France.

Originally constructed via the imperial decree of King Louis XVIII on 25 March 1813, the chapel was formerly within the Hotel de Châtillon. It was blessed and dedicated to the Sacred Heart of Jesus on 6 August 1815 and served as a part of the motherhouse of the Order of the Daughters of Charity of Saint Vincent de Paul.

The famed address of the shrine is #140 — Rue du Bac, Paris, France. The chapel is reputed to be where the Blessed Virgin Mary allegedly appeared to then religious novice Catherine Labouré in December 1830 and requested the creation of the medal of the "Immaculate Conception" that came to be known as the "Miraculous Medal" by popular demand. 

Pope Leo XIII granted the venerated Marian image enshrined within a decree of pontifical coronation on 2 March 1897 via the Archbishop of Paris, Cardinal François-Marie-Benjamin Richard and was crowned on 26 July 1897. Accordingly, Pope Pius XII granted a decree of coronation for another namesake image venerated in Maastricht, Netherlands on 15 March 1956 which later took place on 27 May of the same year.

Marian apparitions
 
The chapel at Rue du Bac, Paris, is the site of a number of apparitions said to have been experienced by Catherine Labouré. It was here on three successive days, while praying, that Vincent de Paul showed her his heart three times in a different colour: 
 White —  the colour of peace
 Red —  the colour of fire
 Black — an indication of the misfortunes on the city of Paris.

Shortly after, Labouré saw Christ present in the Sacred Host, and on 6 June 1830, the Feast of the Holy Trinity, Christ appeared as a crucified king, stripped of all his adornments.

In 1830, Labourè (age 24) received three visits from the Blessed Virgin Mary. On the first visit, the night of 18 July, she received a request that a Confraternity of the Children of Mary be established. Accordingly, the Virgin Mary later requested the creation of a medal with the following invocation: 

From May 1832 onwards, the medal was extraordinarily disseminated and is said to convert, protect, and perform miracles, was called "miraculous" by the faithful.

In 1849, the chapel was expanded and thereafter other modifications were executed. Since 1930, the date of its complete renovation, the chapel is as it is known today.

Marian iconography

Due to the popularity of the Miraculous Medal, a 19th century iconography of the Virgin Mary in its outstretched arms later became popularized in the United States of America titled as "Our Lady of Grace" in the 1950s due to the apparitions at the namesake "Chapel of Our Lady of Graces of the Miraculous Virgin". 

Accordingly, the venerated statue crowned by Pope Leo XIII in 1897 helped recognize the image and help spread its Marian devotion. However, in some Italian and Spanish Catholic countries, the original name was retained as "Vergine di Miracolo" (Basilica della Santa Andrea Fratte) or "Virgen de (Medalla) Milagrosa". It features a standing pose atop a globe with a serpent and two six-pointed stars while another variant image of the apparition called "Our Lady of the Globe" features a standing Virgin holding a globe by her arms (enshrined at the side altar of the chapel).

Present status
Only the 17th-century  tabernacle remain unchanged since 1815. This tabernacle came from the original building allocated in 1800 to the Daughters of Charity. Once lost, it was rediscovered  in the chapel of the Sisters of Mercy and was installed there before the French Revolution. 

Catherine Labouré declared that it was in front of the tabernacle that the Blessed Virgin Mary prostrated herself in the nights of 18 and 19 July 1830 and that she was above it during the third apparition in December 1830. In 1850, an ivory crucifix was placed on top of this tabernacle.

Marian pilgrimages

The chapel, as a site of Marian apparition, is a Marian shrine and hence a site of Catholic pilgrimage.

The wax effigy containing the bones of Louise de Marillac and the heart of Vincent de Paul, founders of the Daughters of Charity of Saint Vincent de Paul, are kept there. The incorrupt body of Catherine Labouré, member of the Daughters of Charity of Saint Vincent de Paul and famous Marian visionary, also lies in a glass coffin at the side altar of the chapel.

References

Books
 Petit guide de la chapelle Notre-Dame de la Médaille Miraculeuse, Editions du Signe, 2002

External links
 The Chapel of Our Lady of the Miraculous Medal – Official Website

Shrines to the Virgin Mary
Roman Catholic chapels in Paris
Roman Catholic churches in the 7th arrondissement of Paris
1815 establishments in France
Roman Catholic shrines in France